Byron Emmerson Johnson (September 16, 1911 – September 24, 2005), also known as Mex Johnson, was a baseball player in the Negro leagues.  His nickname came from a hat he wore as a child which looked like a sombrero.

Born in Little Rock, Arkansas, United States, he began his Negro leagues career in 1937 as a shortstop with the Kansas City Monarchs and stayed with the Monarchs until his retirement in 1940. He also was on the road team the Monarchs called the Satchel Paige All Stars from 1939 to 1940.

Johnson accomplishments as a player included being selected as a member of the Negro leagues East-West All-Star team in 1938.

The Negro League Baseball museum, located in Kansas City, Mo, used to have a sculpture that was set out which was his hands holding a bat. Many thought that was the hands of Buck O’Neil, another more well-known player, but it was Mr. Johnson’s. 

He was drafted into the U.S. Army in 1941 to fight in World War II and served in Europe until 1945.

References

External links 
 and Seamheads
 Negro League Players Association
 

1911 births
2005 deaths
Deaths from prostate cancer
Kansas City Monarchs players
Sportspeople from Little Rock, Arkansas
Deaths from cancer in Colorado
20th-century African-American sportspeople
21st-century African-American people
United States Army personnel of World War II
African Americans in World War II
Burials at Fort Logan National Cemetery
African-American United States Army personnel